Mycosphaerella bolleana is a fungal plant pathogen.

See also
 List of Mycosphaerella species

References

External links
 New Zealand Fungi: Mycosphaerella bolleana

bolleana
Fungal plant pathogens and diseases
Fungi described in 1920